The Ethiopian Catholic Eparchy of Adigrat is a Catholic eparchy located in the city of Adigrat, Ethiopia. It is in the ecclesiastical province of Addis Ababa.

History
On 25 March 1937, Pope Pius XI established the Prefecture Apostolic of Tigray from the Vicariate Apostolic of Abyssinia. Pope John XXIII elevated it as the Eparchy of Adigrat on 20 February 1961.

Ordinaries
Bartolomeo Bechis, C.M. † (1937 - 1939 Resigned) 
Salvatore Pane, C.M. † (10 Jun 1939 - 1951 Died) 
Hailé Mariam Cahsai † (20 Feb 1961 - 24 Nov 1970 Died) 
Sebhat-Leab Worku, S.D.B. † (12 Jun 1971 - 12 Oct 1984 Resigned) 
Kidane-Mariam Teklehaimanot † (12 Oct 1984 - 16 Nov 2001 Resigned) 
Tesfasellassie Medhin (16 Nov 2001–present)

OVC Project
The ADCS (Adigrat Diocese Catholic Secretary) is responsible for an OVC project (OVC = "Orphans and Vulnerable Children") that grants micro-scholarships to disadvantaged young people in the Tigray region. In 2010–2017, the Student Initiative Rahel in Germany collected donations for the OVC project in Adigrat.

References

External links
Official website: Ethiopian Catholic Eparchy of Adigrat

Ethiopian Catholic Church
Catholic dioceses in Ethiopia
Eastern Catholic dioceses
Christian organizations established in 1937
Adigrat
1937 establishments in Ethiopia